The World Fantasy Awards are given each year by the World Fantasy Convention for the best fantasy fiction published in English during the previous calendar year. The awards have been described by book critics such as The Guardian as a "prestigious fantasy prize", and one of the three most prestigious speculative fiction awards, along with the Hugo and Nebula Awards (which cover both fantasy and science fiction). The World Fantasy Award—Novella is given each year for fantasy stories published in English. A work of fiction is eligible for the category if it is between 10,000 and 40,000 words in length; awards are also given out for longer pieces in the Novel category and shorter lengths in the Short Fiction category. The Novella category has been awarded annually since 1982, though between 1975—when the World Fantasy Awards were instated—and 1982 the short fiction category covered works of up to 40,000 words. In 2016, the name of the category was changed from Best Novella to Long Fiction, before reverting to Novella in 2018.

World Fantasy Award nominees and winners are decided by attendees and judges at the annual World Fantasy Convention. A ballot is posted in June for attendees of the current and previous two conferences to determine two of the finalists, and a panel of five judges adds three or more nominees before voting on the overall winner. The panel of judges is typically made up of fantasy authors and is chosen each year by the World Fantasy Awards Administration, which has the power to break ties. The final results are presented at the World Fantasy Convention at the end of October. Winners were presented with a statue in the form of a bust of H. P. Lovecraft through the 2015 awards; more recent winners receive a statuette of a tree.

During the 41 nomination years, 149 authors have had works nominated; 40 of them have won, including ties and co-authors. Only five authors have won more than once: Elizabeth Hand, with three wins out of nine nominations; Richard Bowes, with two wins out of three nominations; K. J. Parker, who also won twice out of three nominations; Ellen Klages, with two wins out of two nominations; and Kij Johnson, also with two wins out of two nominations. Of authors who have won at least once, Hand has the most nominations, followed by George R. R. Martin at five and Ursula K. Le Guin at four. Lucius Shepard has the most nominations without winning and the most overall at ten; he is followed by Kim Newman, who has six nominations without winning.

Winners and nominees
In the following table, the years correspond to the date of the ceremony, rather than when the work was first published. Each year links to the corresponding "year in literature". Entries with a blue background and an asterisk (*) next to the writer's name have won the award; those with a white background are the other nominees on the shortlist.

  *   Winners

References

External links
 World Fantasy Convention official site

Awards established in 1982
Novella awards
Long Fiction
Speculative fiction award-winning novellas
1982 establishments in the United States